Georges Philibert Charles Maroniez (17 January 1865, Douai – 11 December 1933, Paris) was a French painter, specializing in landscapes with figures.

Biography

Education and first works
Maroniez was the son of an industrialist who owned a sugar refinery in Montigny-en-Ostrevent. He displayed artistic talent at an early age, but – although not discouraged – was expected to pursue a more professional career. Accordingly, he studied law, and afterwards served as a magistrate in, successively, Boulogne-sur-Mer (1891), Avesnes-sur-Helpe (1894) and Cambrai (1897).

It was there that he met the painter Adrien Demont, the son-in-law of Jules Breton. Urged on by Breton, at the age of 22 he started exhibiting peasant genre and landscape scenes in Douai and Paris. He began vacationing in Wissant, where he stayed with Demont and his wife, Virginie Demont-Breton, painting the coastal scenery and becoming associated with the "École de Wissant", founded by Henri and Marie Duhem. In 1889, he became a member of the Société des Artistes Français.

At the annual Salon des artistes français, he was awarded a Honorable Mention in 1891, a 3rd Medal in 1905, and a 2nd Medal in 1906. Defying the label of "marine painter", he filled his genre scene paintings with Flemish realism. Using a luminous, caressing light, he transposed the grey country roads of his birthplace with light, and painted eloquent snowy landscapes. He painted ports of Brittany, France, Belgium and the Netherlands, as well as numerous scenes of the fisherman's life, especially at twilight or night. He captured the magnetic beauty of an ocean sunset, and the tranquility that beauty and light brings.

Inventions
Maroniez also became interested in photography and invented one of the first hand-held cameras, a device which he soon simplified, named the "Sphynx" and patented in 1891. The camera used a type of film invented by chemist Victor Planchon, a relative of his. He travelled widely throughout the Mediterranean, North Africa and the Middle East, using his device to take over 1,600 images that are in the collection of the museum in Cambrai. Later he devised and patented a method of suppressing the vibrations and jerky movements produced by the cinematographs of the Lumière Brothers, which had its unveiling in 1899 at the Société Photographique in Cambrai.

In 1905, the success of his paintings and the anti-clerical attitudes of the Combes administration led him to resign from the judiciary, and to devote himself entirely to art.

World War I and maturity
In August 1914, Maroniez was drafted into Military Justice. In 1918 he was created a Knight of the Légion d'honneur. During the German occupation of north-east France, his studio was looted, and his wife was deported, with hundreds of other French civilian hostages, to Holzminden internment camp in Lower Saxony. The family was reunited only after the ceasefire; they relocated to Paris in 1919.

He subsequently took most of his inspiration from Brittany. His works were very popular but, according to some critics, became repetitive and too commercial. Over 800 paintings are attributed to him, of which the majority are in private collections. He died of a heart attack in 1933 and was interred in the family vault at Cambrai.

Gallery

References

Further reading
 Jacques Maroniez, Catalogue raisonné des œuvres de Georges, Philibert, Charles Maroniez (1865 -1933), 1999 (Supplement, 2009)
 Dominique Tonneau Ryckelynck, Géraldine Piveteau, Alain Deflesselles and Manuela Cortal, Instants des Forts - Georges Maroniez photographe le long du chenal, il y a un siècle (exhibition catalog, 26 April - 2 September 2002), Musée de Gravelines, 2002, 
 Yann Gobert-Sergent, "Georges Maroniez, Parcours pictural autour de la Côte d'Opale", Revue Boulogne et la Mer, October 2008.
 Yann Gobert-Sergent, Georges Maroniez, un peintre de marines de la Côte d'Opale, Cercle Historique Portelois, Le Portel, juin 2022, pp. 90-95.
 Manuela Cortal, "Georges Maroniez, peintre et photographe", in Bononia, #27 and #28, Association des amis des musées de Boulogne-Sur-Mer, 1995 - 1996
 , Maroniez, Georges Philibert Charles.

External links

 Works by Maroniez in the museums of Nord-Pas-de-Calais
 Cinematographes (website): Georges Maroniez et ses appareils photographiques et cinématographique

1865 births
1933 deaths
French genre painters
19th-century French painters
French male painters
20th-century French painters
20th-century French male artists
19th-century French male artists